"Rebels Are We" is a song by American R&B band Chic. It was the first single from their fourth studio album, 1980's Real People. The song, featuring a solo lead vocal by Luci Martin, marked a change of direction for the band; incorporating harder rock/new wave elements into their trademark funk sound. The song peaked at number 8 on Billboard's "Hot Soul/Black Singles" chart and number 61 on Billboard's "Hot 100" chart). The song has been included in many compilation albums such as The Best of Chic, Volume 2 and The Very Best of Chic.

Record World said that "Luci Martin's vocal is superb."

Track listings
Atlantic 7" 3665 June 13 1980
 A. "Rebels Are We" (7" Edit) - 3:19
 B. "Open Up" 3:58

Atlantic promo 12" DMD 241, 1980
 A. "Rebels Are We" - 4:53
 B. "Rebels Are We" (7" Edit) - 3:19

Chart positions

References

1980 singles
Chic (band) songs
Song recordings produced by Nile Rodgers
Songs written by Nile Rodgers
Songs written by Bernard Edwards
Song recordings produced by Bernard Edwards
1980 songs
Atlantic Records singles